Roz Peterson is an American politician, businesswoman, and realtor. She is a former Republican member of the Minnesota House of Representatives, representing District 56B in the southern Twin Cities metropolitan area.

Early life
Peterson attended Gustavus Adolphus College, graduating with a bachelor's degree in 1987. She served on the Lakeville school board prior to being elected to the Minnesota House of Representatives.

Minnesota House of Representatives
Peterson was first elected to the Minnesota House of Representatives in 2014. She had previously sought election in 2012. Peterson served two terms in the Minnesota House, and was defeated by Alice Mann in the 2018 elections. In the 2020 elections, Peterson ran for her previously held District 56B seat, losing to Kaela Berg.

Personal life
Peterson married her husband, Tim, in 1987. They have two children and reside in Lakeville, Minnesota.

References

External links

Roz Peterson official campaign website

Living people
Women state legislators in Minnesota
Members of the Minnesota House of Representatives
Gustavus Adolphus College alumni
School board members in Minnesota
Businesspeople from Minnesota
21st-century American politicians
21st-century American women politicians
People from Lakeville, Minnesota
1965 births